CFCF is the stage name of Canadian electronic musician/vocalist Michael Silver. Based in Montreal, Silver took the name CFCF from the call sign of the city's CFCF-TV.

Silver has released five albums and several EPs. In 2015 he released two albums within two weeks: Radiance and Submission on July 31, and The Colours of Life on August 14. His most recent release is memoryland (2021).

Background
Originally from Montreal, Silver became interested in electronic music at an early age. Self-taught, he cites Peter Gabriel, DJ Shadow, the Yellow Magic Orchestra and Talk Talk as important influences.

His first 7" single "You Hear Colours" / "Invitation to Love" was released on March 8, 2009, on the Acéphale label. The title of his first EP Panesian Nights was chosen in reference to the developer of Japanese erotic video games.

In addition to his own recordings, Silver has also remixed songs for other artists, including Holy Ghost!, Crystal Castles, Sally Shapiro, The Presets, Health, Azari & III, Harald Grosskopf and Owen Pallett.

In 2014, Silver co-wrote and co-produced the songs "A Power" and "What You Wanted" on How To Dress Well's album, What Is This Heart?.

In 2016, Silver was nominated for the Grammy Award for Best Remixed Recording, Non-Classical for his remix of Berlin By Overnight by Daniel Hope.

Discography

Studio albums 
 2009 – Continent, Paper Bag Records
 2013 – Outside, Paper Bag Records
 2015 – Radiance and Submission, Driftless Recordings
 2015 – The Colours of Life, 1080p Collection
 2016 – On Vacation, International Feel
 2019 – Liquid Colours, BGM Solutions
 2021 – Memoryland, BGM Solutions

EPs
 2009 – Panesian Nights, Paper Bag Records
 2010 – Drifts, Paper Bag Records
 2010 – CFCF c28, They Live We Sleep
 2010 – The River, RVNG Intl.
 2012 – Exercises, Paper Bag Records / Dummy
 2013 – Music for Objects, Paper Bag Records / Dummy
 2017 – Cascades (with Jean-Michel Blais), Arts & Crafts
 2018 – Self Service, Sounds Of Beaubien Ouest

Singles
 2009 – "The Explorers", Paper Bag Records
 2009 – "You Hear Colours" / "Invitation to Love", Acephale Records
 2011 – "Cometrue", UNO NYC

Mixtapes
 2010 – Slow R&B for Zellers Locations Canada-Wide
 2010 – Do U Like Night Bus
 2010 – Altered Zones 4
 2011 – Reincarnation
 2011 – Slorida
 2011 – Night Bus II
 2012 – The Flood for SSENSE
 2014 – Night Bus 3: Death of Night Bus
 2015 – Blowing Up The Workshop #48
 2019 – Night Bus 4: Memory of Night Bus
 2020 – MMLD 99.9 FM: Dispatches From Memoryland

Remixes
 2008 – Heartsrevolution – CYOA (CFCF Remix)
 2008 – The Presets – Talk Like That (CFCF Remix)
 2008 – HEALTH – Triceratops (CFCF Remix)
 2008 – Sally Shapiro – Time To Let Go (CFCF Remix)
 2008 – Crystal Castles – Air War (CFCF Remix)
 2008 – Genghis Tron – Recursion (CFCF Remix)
 2008 – Memory Cassette – Last One Awake (CFCF Version)
 2009 – Sally Shapiro – Love In July (CFCF Remix)
 2009 – Datarock – The Pretender (CFCF Remix)
 2009 – Fan Death – The Constellations (CFCF Remix)
 2009 – Midstates and The Choir of Ghosts – Hate To See You Smile (CFCF Remix)
 2009 – Woodhands – Dancer (CFCF Remix)
 2010 – Owen Pallett – Lewis Takes Off His Shirt (CFCF Remix)
 2010 – Azari & III – Into The Night (CFCF Remix)
 2010 – Historics – Take It To The Top (CFCF Remix)
 2010 – HEALTH – Before Tigers (CFCF Remix)
 2012 – Say Lou Lou – Maybe You (CFCF Remix)
 2017 – Kero Kero Bonito – Heard a Song (CFCF Remix)
 2017 – HEALTH – Dark Enough (CFCF Remix)

References

External links
CFCF on SoundCloud
CFCF on Bandcamp
CFCF on Discogs
CFCF at CBC Radio 3

Canadian electronic musicians
Musicians from Montreal
Remixers
Paper Bag Records artists
Living people
1989 births